Iheringichthys labrosus is a species of long-whiskered catfish native to the Paraná River basin and Uruguay River basin in Argentina, Brazil, Paraguay and Uruguay.  This species grows to a length of  TL.

References
 

Pimelodidae
Catfish of South America
Freshwater fish of Argentina
Freshwater fish of Brazil
Fish of Paraguay
Fish of Uruguay
Fish described in 1874
Taxa named by Christian Frederik Lütken